Russia participated in 12 editions of the Universiade, debuting at the 1993 Summer Universiade. The 2013 Summer Universiade was the best for Russia, beating the previous total medal and gold record of the 1973 Summer Universiade, of the then USSR. Furthermore, Russia produced a number of Universiade records, including the total medals won. Russia hosted the 2013 Summer Universiade in Kazan and the 2019 Winter Universiade in Krasnoyarsk.

In reaction to the 2022 Russian invasion of Ukraine, Russian athletes were banned from competing in the 2022 FISU Summer World University Games in Chengdu, China, and FISU postponed Russia's hosting rights for the 2023 Summer World University Games.

Medal count

Medals at the Summer Universiade

Medals at the Winter Universiade

See also 
Russia at the Olympics
Russia at the Paralympics

References

External links
 FISU History at the FISU

 
Nations at the Universiade
Student sport in Russia